Patrick Brennan  (July 30, 1877 – May 1, 1961) was an Irish-born Canadian lacrosse player who competed in the 1908 Summer Olympics. He was part of the Canadian team which won the gold medal. He was inducted into the Canadian Lacrosse Hall of Fame in 1966.

Biography
Brennan was born on Ireland but came to Canada at the age of three. On club level he represented the Montreal Shamrocks. He died at Notre Dame de l'Esperance Hospital in Montreal in 1961, aged 83.

References

External links
Olympic profile

1877 births
1961 deaths
Canadian lacrosse players
Olympic lacrosse players of Canada
Lacrosse players at the 1908 Summer Olympics
Olympic gold medalists for Canada
Medalists at the 1908 Summer Olympics
Olympic medalists in lacrosse
Irish emigrants to Canada (before 1923)